Ronald Fraser may refer to:
 Ronald Fraser (actor), (1930–1997), Scottish actor
 Ronald Fraser (historian), (1930–2012), British historian
 Ron Fraser (1933–2013), American baseball coach
 Ronnie Fraser (1929–2010), Scottish journalist and politician
Ron Frazer (1928–1983), Australian actor